Sasha Waters (also known as Sasha Waters Freyer; born November 19, 1968) is an American filmmaker and a professor  of Film and Art Foundations at the #1 public Fine Arts School in the country, Virginia Commonwealth University.

Since 1998, Waters has produced and directed 18 documentary and experimental films, 14 of which originate in 16mm. Her films include Garry Winogrand: All Things Are Photographable.

Early life and education
Sasha Waters was born in Brooklyn and received her BFA in Photography from the School of Visual Arts in 1991. She moved from photography to filmmaking shortly after graduation, working for Michael Almereyda, Hal Hartley, Barbara Kopple and Rocky Collins among others. While working for Kopple, Sasha met Iana Porter with whom she founded the New York production company Emotion Motion Pictures, Inc.

Waters earned her MFA in Film & Media Arts from Temple University in 1999, where she studied with experimental filmmakers Lynne Sachs and Rea Tajiri.

Teaching career
In 2000, Waters accepted a position teaching filmmaking at the University of Iowa.

In 2013, Waters left the University of Iowa to serve as the Chair (2013 - 2019) of the Department of Photography + Film at VCU School of the Art in Richmond, VA, where she currently teaches BFA and MFA students working in photography, film and media.

Filmmaking
With the exception of her first documentary (Whipped, 1998), she has edited of all of her films. Embracing a personal, artisanal approach to craft, she also served as the cinematographer, primarily in 16mm, and sound editor, on 11 of them. Trained in photography and the documentary tradition, Waters' films explore outsiders, misfits and everyday radicals.

At the University of Iowa she developed a body of personal experimental and essay films. While Waters' films screen primarily in festival/museum black box spaces, she has also shown in galleries.

Whipped
Waters co-produced her first film with Iana Porter, Whipped (1998), a 16mm documentary portrait of three professional New York dominatrixes. Whipped was funded in part by Sub Pop Records; was selected for the first-ever Sundance Independent Producers conference, and aired nationally on the Sundance Channel in the early 2000s. The end credits of Whipped featured an otherwise unpublished cover track of the song "Hopelessly Devoted to You" performed by the 1990s alt-country band, Clem Snide.

Razing Appalachia
Her film Razing Appalachia, which chronicled a years-long struggle against the expansion of then the nation's largest strip mine in rural West Virginia, aired on the PBS series Independent Lens in 2003.

Razing Appalachia was the first feature documentary film about the environmental and social costs of mountaintop removal mining and has since screened in more than 30 countries globally. Writing in The New Yorker, Nancy Franklin said of Razing Appalachia that the film was a "good example of what makes public television valuable."

Razing Appalachia earned awards at several U.S. film festivals including the Vermont International Film Festival, the EarthVision Environmental Film Festival and the Rural Route Film Festival and is distributed by Bullfrog Films.

Chekhov for Children
Her 2010 documentary Chekhov for Children, premiered in the U.S. at the Telluride Film Festival and internationally at the Rotterdam International Film Festival. Chekhov for Children was listed as one of the Best Undistributed Films of the year in the IndieWiRE Annual Critics Survey, 2010.

Garry Winogrand: All Things Are Photographable
Her most recent feature documentary, Garry Winogrand: All Things Are Photographable, screened theatrically and at festivals around the world in 2018; was called one of the year's best by The New Yorker's Richard Brody, and won a Special Jury Prize in the Documentary Competition at the 2018 SXSW Film Festival. Winogrand aired on the PBS series American Masters in April 2019.

Awards and recognition
Waters is the recipient of a 2019/20 Fellowship from the Virginia Museum of Fine Arts  and recipient of the Orphan Film Symposium's 2016 Helen Hill Award, honoring the legacy of artist, educator and activist Helen Hill.

Other grants and awards include Best in Show at New Waves, Virginia Museum of Contemporary Art (2016); and Media Arts Production Grants from the National Endowment for the Arts in 2020, 2015 and 2007; Waters has been a Fellow at The MacDowell Colony (2017, 2002, 1999), Yaddo, and the Virginia Center for the Creative Arts.

Her experimental 16mm short Our Summer Made her Light Escape was included in the 2013 Senses of Cinema World Poll; Our Summer was also included on the Cinefile "Best of the Decade" list, along with her experimental shorts A Partial History of the Natural World, 1965 and dragons & seraphim.

Waters is included in Edited By: Women Film Editors, a survey of women who "invented, developed, fine-tuned and revolutionized the art of film editing" (creation of avant-garde filmmaker Su Friedrich, Princeton, 2019). She is also included in the FemEx Film Archive (UC Santa Cruz/ UC Davis, 2017), an ongoing collective archive of interviews with feminist experimental filmmakers collaboratively launched by filmmakers Irene Lusztig and Julie Wyman.

Personal life
At the University of Iowa she met her husband, media and social practice artist John D. Freyer.

References

External links
  – pieshake.com
"SXSW 2018 Women Directors: Meet Sasha Waters Freyer," Women and Hollywood Interview
"Garry Winogrand and the End of an Era," Seph Rodney, Hyperallergic
Garry Winogrand: All Things are Photographable on Rotten Tomatoes
 Interview about Chekhov for Children on The Leonard Lopate Show, WNYC

School of Visual Arts alumni
Temple University Tyler School of Art alumni
1968 births
Living people
University of Michigan people